Boss Soul! is an album by saxophonist Gene Ammons recorded in 1961 and released on the Prestige label. The album was recorded at the same sessions that produced Up Tight!.

Reception
Allmusic awarded the album 3 stars with its review by Stewart Mason stating, "Boss Soul is not a top-drawer Gene Ammons release, but it's thoroughly enjoyable throughout".

Track listing 
All compositions by Gene Ammons except where noted.
 "Soft Summer Breeze" (Eddie Heywood, J. Spencer) – 4:50   
 "Don't Go to Strangers" (Redd Evans, Arthur Kent, Dave Mann) – 6:23   
 "Song of the Islands" (Charles E. King) – 5:10   
 "Travelin'" (Kenny Burrell) – 3:40   
 "Carbow" – 6:05   
 "(I'm Afraid) The Masquerade Is Over" (Herbert Magidson, Allie Wrubel) – 6:00   
 "I'm Beginning to See the Light" (Duke Ellington, Don George, Johnny Hodges, Harry James) – 4:45

Note
Recorded at Van Gelder Studios in Englewood Cliffs, New Jersey on October 17, 1961 (tracks 6-8) and October 18, 1961 (tracks 1-5)

Personnel 
Gene Ammons – tenor saxophone
Walter Bishop Jr. (tracks 6-8), Patti Bown (tracks 1-5) – piano 
Art Davis (tracks 6-8), George Duvivier (tracks 1-5) – bass
Art Taylor – drums
Ray Barretto – congas

References 

Gene Ammons albums
1963 albums
Prestige Records albums
Albums recorded at Van Gelder Studio
Albums produced by Esmond Edwards